John VI of Alexandria may refer to:

 Patriarch John VI of Alexandria, Greek Patriarch of Alexandria in 1062–1100
 Pope John VI of Alexandria, ruled in 1189–1216